Frank Clegg is the CEO of Canadians For Safe Technology, and former president of Microsoft Canada.

Personal life
Frank Clegg resides in Oakville, Canada. He is married and has two daughters.

Career
Frank Clegg was employed for 12 years at IBM. In 1991, Clegg joined Microsoft Canada. Five years later in 1996, he was appointed vice president of the company, and then president of Microsoft Canada in 2000. He departed from the company in 2005.

Advocate for Safer Technology
Frank Clegg is the founder and CEO of Canadians for Safe Technology, a not-for-profit, volunteer coalition of citizens and scientists who are concerned about the health risks of wireless technology. C4ST’s mission is to educate and inform Canadians and policy makers about the dangers of exposures to unsafe levels of radiofrequency/microwave radiation from wireless devices and cellular network antennas wireless technology. Frank is critical of the use of Wi-Fi in schools, and the 5G mobile network.

He has previously written articles for HuffPost about wireless exposure.

References

Living people
Year of birth missing (living people)
People from Oakville, Ontario
Canadian chief executives
Microsoft employees